Jean-Damascène Sallusti (An Deyi) (d. 1781) was an Italian missionary to China, as well as a court painter under the Qianlong Emperor of the Qing dynasty.

A member of the Augustinian order, and later a Jesuit, Sallusti was (somewhat controversially) appointed Bishop of Beijing in 1778, a position he held until his death in 1781.  As a painter, he was a contemporary of Giuseppe Castiglione and Ignatius Sichelbart, and with them was responsible for the creation of the Emperor's "Battle Copper Prints", commemorating the I-li campaign. Work by Sallusti is held in the collection of the Cleveland Museum of Art.

References

External links

Jesuit missionaries in China
Jesuit bishops
Qing dynasty painters
1781 deaths
Year of birth unknown
18th-century Italian painters
Italian male painters
18th-century Italian Jesuits
Italian Roman Catholic missionaries
Italian emigrants to China